Kukkunni was a king of Wilusa mentioned in the Alaksandu Treaty as an ally of the Hittite king Suppiluliuma I. He ruled over the city during a period of peace and prosperity visible in the archaeological layer of Troy VI. The later Greek name Kyknos has been argued to be a Hellenization of his name.

References

Kings of Wilusa